Vittorit Folonari (24 September 1915 – 1 September 2010) was an Italian bobsledder who competed in the late 1940s and early 1950s. Competing in two Winter Olympics, he earned his best finish of 11th in the four-man event at St. Moritz in 1948.

References

External links
 
1948 bobsleigh four-man results
1952 bobsleigh four-man results
Vittorio Folonari's profile at Sports Reference.com

Olympic bobsledders of Italy
Bobsledders at the 1948 Winter Olympics
Bobsledders at the 1952 Winter Olympics
Italian male bobsledders
1915 births
2010 deaths